The 1933 Michigan State Normal Hurons football team was an American football team that represented Michigan State Normal College (later renamed Eastern Michigan University) during the 1933 college football season. In their 12th season under head coach Elton Rynearson, the Hurons compiled a 6–2 record and outscored opponents by a total of 115 to 71. Carl Bowman was the team captain.  The team played its home games at Normal Field on the school's campus in Ypsilanti, Michigan.

Schedule

References

Michigan State Normal
Eastern Michigan Eagles football seasons
Michigan State Normal Hurons football